"The United States of Lyncherdom" is an essay by Mark Twain written in 1901. He wrote it in response to the mass lynchings in Pierce City, Missouri, of Will Godley, his grandfather French Godley, and Eugene Carter (also known as Barrett). The three African Americans were accused in the rape and murder there of Gazelle Wild (or Casselle Wilds) on August 19, 1901, Twain blamed lynching in the United States on the herd mentality that prevails among Americans. Twain decided that the country was not ready for the essay, and shelved it. 

A redacted version was published in 1923, when Twain's literary executor, Albert Bigelow Paine, slipped it into a posthumous collection, Europe and Elsewhere. In his essay, Twain noted two law enforcement officials who had intervened and prevented lynchings in early 20th-century America. They were Sheriff Joseph Merrill of Carroll County, Georgia, and Thomas Beloat of Gibson County, Indiana.

References

External links 

1901 essays
1923 essays
Essays by Mark Twain
Lynching in the United States
Essays published posthumously
Works about Missouri

de:König Leopolds Selbstgespräch